A panel discussion, or simply a panel, involves a group of people gathered to discuss a topic in front of an audience, typically at scientific, business, or academic conferences, fan conventions, and on television shows. Panels usually include a moderator who guides the discussion and sometimes elicits audience questions, with the goal of being informative and entertaining. Film panels at fan conventions have been credited with boosting box office returns by generating advance buzz.

Format

The typical format for a discussion panel includes a moderator in front of an audience.

Television shows in the English-speaking world that feature a discussion panel format include Real Time with Bill Maher, Loose Women, The Nightly Show with Larry Wilmore, as well as segments of the long-running Meet the Press. Quiz shows featuring this format, such as QI and Never Mind the Buzzcocks, are called panel games.

Fan conventions

Panels at sci-fi fan conventions, such as  San Diego Comic-Con and New York Comic-Con, have become increasingly popular; there are typically long lines to get access to the panels. The panels often feature advance looks at upcoming films and video games. Panels and the early screenings at conventions have been credited as increasing the popularity of blockbuster films in recent years.

One of the earliest film panels was at the 1976 San Diego Comic-Con, when publicist Charles Lippincott hosted a slideshow—in front of a "somewhat skeptical" audience—for an upcoming film called Star Wars. Five years later,  the Blade Runner panel at the 1981 San Diego Comic-Con featured a film featurette, before featurettes were popular. At the 2000 event, The Lord of the Rings: The Fellowship of the Ring preview panel ushered in today's era of hugely popular panels.

Manels

A manel is a panel whose participants are all men. The term is a portmanteau word deriving from man and panel. The Oxford Dictionaries and Cambridge Dictionaries teams both published blogposts on the word in 2017, suggesting the term was new at that time. In the second decade of the twenty-first century, such panels, in academia, the private sector, the media, government, and beyond, became the object of feminist critique and of extensive media discussion, as well as academic research. Commentators challenged conference organisers and speakers to refuse to present manels. Organisations responding included The Financial Times, whose board decided in August 2017 to end men-only conference panels, and encouraged its journalists not to participate in these elsewhere.

See also
News conference

References

Social events
Public relations techniques
Communication
Academic conferences
Promotion and marketing communications